Exposure is a 1932 American drama film directed by Norman Houston and starring Lila Lee, Walter Byron and Tully Marshall.

Cast
 Lila Lee as Doris Corbin 
 Walter Byron as Andy Bryant 
 Tully Marshall as John Ward 
 Mary Doran as Gerry Ward 
 Bryant Washburn as Jimmy Delane 
 Pat O'Malley as Van Avery - City Editor
 Lee Moran as Nosey Newton 
 Spec O'Donnell as Inky 
 Nat Pendleton as Maniac Killer

References

Bibliography
 Pitts, Michael R. Poverty Row Studios, 1929–1940: An Illustrated History of 55 Independent Film Companies, with a Filmography for Each. McFarland & Company, 2005.

External links
 

1932 films
1932 drama films
American drama films
Films directed by Norman Houston
American black-and-white films
1930s English-language films
1930s American films